General elections were held in Lebanon in 1927. The new Parliament had 46 members, and was formed by adding 16 elected members to the 30 elected members from the previous Representative Council.

Results

Elected members

See also
List of members of the 1st Lebanese Parliament

References

Elections in Lebanon
Lebanon
1927 in Lebanon